The history of the United States women's national soccer team began in 1985 — the year when the United States women's national soccer team played its first match.

History

The team played its first match at the Mundialito tournament on August 18, 1985, coached by Mike Ryan, in which they lost 1–0 to Italy. In March 2004, two of its stars, Mia Hamm (who retired later that year after a post-Olympic team tour of the US) and Michelle Akers (who had already retired), were the only two women and the only two Americans named to the FIFA 100, a list of the 125 greatest living soccer players chosen by Pelé as part of FIFA's centenary observances. Those two women along with Julie Foudy, Kristine Lilly, and the 1999 team started a revolution towards women's team sports in America. The USWNT won every game they played in this tournament. In their group stage, they beat Denmark 3–0 at Giants Stadium just outside New York City, they then thrashed Nigeria 7–1 at Soldier Field in Chicago and finally they beat North Korea 3–0 at Foxboro Stadium near Boston. Going into the knockout stage, they then beat a fancied Germany 3–2 at Jack Kent Cooke Stadium just outside the American capital of Washington, D.C. and the USWNT then traveled to the San Francisco Bay Area to beat Brazil 2–0 at Stanford Stadium in Palo Alto. And then, they traveled to Los Angeles to play China at the Rose Bowl in Pasadena for the final match which would decide the winner of this most prestigious tournament.

This 1999 World Cup final match was arguably the USWNT's most influential and memorable victory. It came when they defeated China 5–4 in a penalty shoot-out following a 0–0 draw after extended time. With this win they emerged onto the world stage and brought significant media attention to women's soccer and athletics. On July 10, 1999, over 90,000 people (the largest ever for a women's sporting event and one of the largest attendances in the world for a tournament game final) filled the Rose Bowl to watch the United States play China in the Final. After a back and forth game, the score was tied 0–0 at full-time, and remained so after extra time, leading to a penalty kick shootout. With Briana Scurry's save of China's third kick, the score was 4–4 with only Brandi Chastain left to shoot. She scored and won the game for the United States. Chastain famously dropped to her knees and whipped off her shirt, celebrating in her sports bra, which later made the cover of Sports Illustrated and the front pages of newspapers around the country and world.

2011
Perhaps the second most influential victory came on July 10, 2011, in the quarterfinal of the 2011 Women's World Cup in Germany, where the U.S. defeated Brazil 5–3 on penalty kicks. Brazil had annihilated the USA in the previous world cup (2007), handing the USA their worst defeat in the history of the program: 4–0 in the semifinal. Coming into the match, the USA had never failed to advance to the semifinal round in (women's) world cup history. Brazil also featured reigning five time Fifa Women's World Player of the Year, Marta. Brazil had been finalists in the past three major international tournaments (2004 and 2008 Olympics; 2007 World Cup), but had yet to win a championship. Thanks to a blistering cross by Shannon Boxx and a charging run by Abby Wambach, the USA forced an own goal in the opening minutes of the match and went up 1–0. Midway through the second half, Marta made a run at the USA's goal and USA defender Rachel Buehler challenged. The referee, Jacqui Melksham, ruled it a foul, gave Brazil a penalty kick, and red carded Buehler, sending her off in the 65th minute. Hope Solo saved the initial penalty kick made by Cristiane, but this was controversially overruled by the referee, and the penalty kick was ordered to be retaken. Marta converted, tying the game 1–1. Melksham initially claimed the reason for the red was that Hope Solo had stepped off the line. Solo was yellow-carded for either this offense or for protesting (the reason for the card was never confirmed). Video replay proved Solo had not come off the line, and after the match, the official record claimed that the true offense was a US player encroaching into the box before the initial PK was taken. In the first overtime, Marta scored, again controversially as the player who assisted her looked to be offsides, but this was not called. The US had less than 20 minutes to equalize, all while playing down a player since the 65th minute. In the 117th minute, the Brazilian Erika received a yellow card for gamesmanship, when she faked injury for several minutes, was placed on a stretcher and carried to the corner flag before she leapt off the stretcher and ran back onto the pitch. This confused everyone as to how much injury time was left. In the 121st minute, Carli Lloyd took a shot and missed, giving possession back to Brazil. Cristiane took the ball to the USA's corner and stood on it, wanting to waste the clock. USA captain Christie Rampone pressured her to pass and the ball was intercepted by Ali Krieger. Krieger passed to Lloyd who dribbled upfield and drew several Brazilian players, leaving Megan Rapinoe open on the wing. Lloyd passed to Rapinoe who hugged the sideline. Just past the midstripe, Rapinoe hammered a left-footed (she's dominantly right-footed) 45 yard cross to the Brazilian back post where Abby Wambach was crashing. It was the 122nd minute, and Abby scored on her signature header. The goal was called the "Header Heard Round the World" and it tied the game 2–2. It has been voted the greatest goal in US soccer history and the greatest goal in women's world cup history. Commentator Ian Darke shouted, "OH DO YOU BELIEVE THIS?! ABBY WAMBACH HAS JUST SAVED THE USA'S LIFE IN THIS WORLD CUP!" and later, "Brazil is denied at the death!" All of the USA's penalty kick takers – Shannon Box, Carli Lloyd, Abby Wambach, Megan Rapinoe, and Ali Krieger – converted their PKs. Hope Solo saved Daiane's attempt at a PK, allowing the US to win 5–3 in PKs. Solo was named MVP of the match. Coincidentally, the USA-Brazil match (nicknamed the "Miracle in Dresden") was played on the 12th anniversary of the memorable 1999 World Cup Final (described above), which the US also won on penalty kicks. Brianna Scurry and Hope Solo each made a save on the third PK taker, and the USA players who scored the winning penalty kicks (Brandi Chastain and Ali Krieger, respectfully) were both defenders who did not normally take PKs.

2012–13
In the 2012 Summer Olympics, the U.S. won the gold medal for the fourth time in five Olympics by defeating Japan 2–1 in front of 80,203 fans at Wembley Stadium, a record for a women's soccer game at the Olympics. The United States advanced to face Japan for the gold medal after the 2011 Women's World Cup Final, won by the Japanese in a penalty shoot-out, by winning arguably one of the greatest games only rivaled by the victories mentioned above. In the semi-final match against Canada, the Americans trailed three times before Alex Morgan's header in the third minute of injury time at the end of 30 minutes of extra-time lifted the team to a 4–3 victory. Morgan's game-winning goal (123') is now the latest tally ever in a FIFA competition. The London Olympics marked the first time the USWNT won every game en route to the gold medal and set an Olympic women's team record of 16 goals scored. Wambach scored a team-leading five goals in five straight games, which is a U.S. and Olympic record, while Morgan and Rapinoe led the team with four assists apiece, which attributed to their team-high tying 10 points. By scoring both goals in the 2012 Olympic final, Carli Lloyd is the only woman in history to score the winning goal in separate gold Olympic matches (2008 and 2012).

In late 2012 U.S. Soccer (along with the Canadian Soccer Association and Mexican Football Federation) announced it would subsidize formation of the new National Women's Soccer League starting in 2013, following previous termination of the Women's United Soccer Association and Women's Professional Soccer leagues. Stated benefits to the women's national team included providing "competitive games week in and week out against the other best players in the country as well as some international players", and giving "opportunities to players who may not have the chance in the past to play for the national team or to players who have been on the fringes but have not been able to break into the squad."

In the 2013 season, USA had an undefeated record of 14–0–2 with their last win against Brazil with a score of 4–1 as part of a longer 43-game unbeaten streak that spanned two years. The USA's 43-game unbeaten streak came to an end after a 1–0 loss against Sweden in the 2014 Algarve Cup. The streak began with a 4–0 win over Sweden in the 2012 Algarve Cup after a 1–0 loss against Japan.  The USWNT's 104-game home unbeaten streak ended on December 16, 2015 with a 1–0 loss to China.

In December 2013, the USWNT All-Time Best XI was chosen by the United States Soccer Federation. Goalie: Brianna Scurry; Defenders: Brandi Chastain, Carla Overbeck, Christie Rampone, Joy Fawcett; Midfielders: Kristine Lilly, Michelle Akers, Julie Foudy; Forwards: Mia Hamm, Abby Wambach, Alex Morgan

2015
On July 5, 2015, USA defeated Japan 5–2 in the final of the 2015 World Cup, claiming their third Women's World Cup title and their first since 1999. Carli Lloyd scored three goals in 16 minutes, including one from 56.9 yards out, achieving the fastest hat-trick from kick-off in World Cup history, not to be confused with the record for briefest hat-trick (time between first and third goals), which is 5 minutes. With Lloyd's third goal, Telemundo announcer, Andres Cantor, shouted "GOOOOOOAL!" for nearly forty seconds. Lauren Holiday scored the winning goal and Tobin Heath scored the USA's fifth goal. With about 10 minutes left, Abby Wambach was subbed into the game, and it was the last World Cup match she would participate in. The fans greeted her with a standing ovation and chanted her name. Lloyd, wanting to honor Abby further, placed the captain's band on her when she entered. Lloyd said, "I wanted to make sure she put the armband on because she deserves it. She has been legendary to this team. She's been unbelievable. I'm so thankful I can call her my friend, my teammate, and I'm just so proud her last World Cup she could go out strong." As Abby entered the match, she high-fived her long time friend and Japanese legend Homare Sawa, who, like Abby, was playing in her final World Cup. Sawa had been subbed into the match in the first half. In the 86th minute, longtime team captain Christie Rampone was subbed into the game and became the oldest player to ever play in a Women's World Cup final. The crowd roared, as this was a further nod of respect from Ellis' 2015 world champion squad to the 1999 championship team. Rampone was the only member of the squad to have been in both championship teams.

While no one pulled a Brandi Chastain in 2015, new enduring images of celebration emerged. Carli Lloyd crying on the field with a relieved grin; Ali Kreiger crying on the same field where she tore her ACL in 2012; Sydney Leroux embracing her husband in the stands, showing that men can be just as supportive of their spouses as their wives are for them; golden confetti showering a victorious USA team as the captains dually lift the trophy. But perhaps the most famous celebration was when Abby Wambach ran to the sideline and kissed her wife, Sara Huffman, whom she had married in 2013. During the 2015 tournament, the Supreme Court of the United States ruled it unconstitutional to deny same-sex couples the right to marriage (Huffman and Wambach were not denied the right to marriage by their state, though prior to the 2015 SCOTUS decision, several states were attempting to make or had made same-sex marriages illegal). While Wambach and Huffman traditionally kept a low profile about their relationship, their kiss was broadcast live and the image went viral with the hashtag #LoveWins on Twitter. Wambach reflected, "It's definitely not something that I ever considered before it happened. It was just in the moment and that's something that I'm proud of — that we could maybe move the needle into [a] more open-minded and accepting frame of mind… Hopefully, if that can help one person feel more confident about their life, then I'm proud." President Obama acknowledge the moment as well when honoring the team at the white house, saying that she and her wife had showed how far America had come, on and off the field.  The victory made the team the first in history to have won three Women's World Cup titles, becoming the most successful team in the tournament to date.

Following their most recent World Cup win, the team was honored with their own ticker tape parade in New York City, the first for a women's sports team, and they also received the Outstanding Team award during the 2015 ESPY Awards and a Teen Choice Award for Favourite Female Athlete(s). They were honored by Glamour Magazine as "Women of the Year." Sports Illustrated celebrated them with 25 covers of the magazine – one of several members of the team, one of Head Coach Jill Ellis, and then one cover for each member of the 23 player squad The team was again honored on October 27, 2015, when President Barack Obama welcomed them to the White House. The president stated, "This team taught all America's children that playing like a girl means you're a badass." He then amended, saying perhaps he should use a different word choice, and said, "Playing like a girl means you're the best."

2016
The USWNT's success ushered in an uncertain following year.  In the second of two matches against China later that year, the USWNT lost for the first time on US soil since 2004.  2016 then saw the US only manage a draw against Colombia in the final group stage match of the Olympic soccer tournament, which was followed by a draw against rival Sweden on August 12, 2016 in the quarter-finals.  During the penalty kick phase that followed the overtime period, Alex Morgan had her kick blocked by Sweden's GK and Christen Press's PK missed the Goal entirely – giving Sweden the win by a 4–3 PK margin.  The devastating loss marked the only time that the USWNT did not advance to the gold medal game of the Olympics. It was also the first time that the USWNT failed to advance to the semi-final round of a major tournament.  Shortly afterwards, US Goal Keeper Hope Solo made news by suggesting that Sweden's game strategy and excessively 'safe' style of play was inconsistent with the spirit of the sport which is commonly called 'the beautiful game'.  Solo's use of the word 'cowards' to describe Sweden's players drew criticism from multiple sources, including at least one of her current teammates, along with ex-USWNT player and ESPN Commentator, Julie Foudy.  On August 24, 2016, US Soccer's governing body suspended Solo for 6 months.  Hope Solo is appealing the suspension.

Competitive record

Major
The two highest-profile tournaments the U.S. team participates in are the quadrennial FIFA Women's World Cup and the quadrennial Olympic Games.

World Cup

The team has participated in every World Cup through 2019 and won a medal in each.

Olympic Games
The team has participated in every Olympic tournament through 2020 and reached the gold medal game in each until 2016, when they were eliminated in the quarterfinals on a penalty shootout loss to Sweden.

Minor

CONCACAF W Championship
The CONCACAF W Championship is the confederation's qualifying tournament for the Women's World Cup. It has been previously known by various names including CONCACAF Women's Championship and CONCACAF Women's Gold Cup.

The 2022 tournament also serves as a qualifying event for the 2024 Summer Olympics tournament and the CONCACAF W Gold Cup, a new tournament not to be confused with one of this tournament's prior names of CONCACAF Women's Gold Cup.

 The US team directly qualified for the 1999 FIFA Women's World Cup as hosts of the event. Because of this, they did not participate in the 1998 CONCACAF Championship, which was the qualification tournament for the World Cup.

CONCACAF Women's Olympic Qualifying Tournament
From 2004 to 2020, the CONCACAF Women's Olympic Qualifying Tournament was the confederation's qualifying tournament for the Olympic Games.

For the 2024 Summer Olympics the winner of the 2022 CONCACAF W Championship will qualify for the 2024 tournament, while the second and third-placed teams will advance to a CONCACAF Olympic play-off, where the winner of the play-off will qualify for the Olympics.

Algarve Cup
The Algarve Cup is a global invitational tournament for national teams in women's soccer hosted by the Portuguese Football Federation (FPF). Held annually in the Algarve region of Portugal since 1994, it is one of the most prestigious women's football events, alongside the Women's World Cup and Women's Olympic Football.

SheBelieves Cup
The SheBelieves Cup is a global invitational tournament organized by the United States Soccer Federation.

Tournament of Nations
The Tournament of Nations is a global invitational tournament organized by the United States Soccer Federation.

International Tournament of Brazil
International Women's Football Tournament of Brazil

Pan American Games
The Pan American Games are held in the same year as the FIFA Women's World Cup, consequently the senior United States women's national soccer team never participated in the Pan American Games. However two youth teams: an under-18 team participated and won the inaugural women's soccer tournament at the 1999 Pan American Games,
and an under-20 team lost in the final to a full Brazil team in the 2007 Pan American Games. Some of the players who participated in those Pan American Games, such as Hope Solo, Tobin Heath, Lauren Cheney (now Holiday), Cat Reddick (now Whitehill) and Kelley O'Hara, later played for the full national team.

Yearly team summary

Past and present uniforms
The USWNT has worn a combination of red, white, or blue (the colors of the national flag) in most years, with exceptions including a gold shirt in 2007, a black shirt in 2011, and black trim with neon green socks for the 2015 World Cup.  In 2012 the team started wearing the same kit as the U.S. men's team, beginning with the red and white hoop design. Nike became the kit supplier for U.S. Soccer in 1995, with an agreement signed in December 2013 to extend the sponsorship through 2022. The USWNT began wearing two stars as of 1999 to signify their two World Cup titles. A third star was added after their third World Cup title in July 2015.

References

External links
 

 
History